Robert Nusser (15 April 1911 – 28 November 2001) was an Austrian ice hockey player. He competed in the men's tournament at the 1956 Winter Olympics.

References

1911 births
2001 deaths
Ice hockey players at the 1956 Winter Olympics
Olympic ice hockey players of Austria
Sportspeople from Klagenfurt